The Cneorhinini are a tribe of weevils in the subfamily Entiminae.

Genera 
 
Acherdus
Analeurops
Anaptoplus
Ansorus
Ascopus
Attactagenus
Bletonius
Catapionus
Cneorhinus
Cneorrhinicollis
Ectatopsides
Embolodes
Eucrines
Euonychus
Fleurops
Formanekia
Gypopnychus
Haplocopes
Heydeneonymus
Leptolepurus
Leurops
Mestorus
Mimaulus
Mutocneorrhinus
Nodierella
Oenassus
Omotrachelus
Philetaerobius
Philopedon
Polydius
Pomphoplesius\
Pomphus
Proictes
Protostrophus
Pseudoblosyrus
Pseudoneliocarus
Pseudopantomorus
Pseudoproictes
Pseudoscolochirus
Pseuonyx
Rhadinocopes
Scolochirus
Synaptocephalodes
Synaptocephalus
Tanysomus

References 

 Lacordaire, T. 1863: Histoire Naturelle des Insectes. Genera des Coléoptères ou exposé méthodique et critique de tous les genres proposés jusqu'ici dans cet ordre d'insectes. Vol.: 6. Roret. Paris: 637 pp.
 Oberprieler, R.G. 2010: A reclassification of the weevil subfamily Cyclominae (Coleoptera: Curculionidae). Zootaxa, 2515: 1–35.
 Roudier, A. 1961: Revision des espèces des Cneorhinus Schönherr appartenant au sousgenre Tretinus Bedel, avec quelques remarques sur la classification des Cneorhinini (Col. Curculionidae). Bull. Soc. ent. France, 66: 191–205

External links 

Entiminae